Liesbeth van Tongeren (born 31 March 1958 in Vlaardingen) is a Dutch politician, and former civil servant and director of Greenpeace Netherlands (2003–2010). As a member of GroenLinks, she was a member of the House of Representatives from 17 June 2010 to 13 June 2018. She focuses on matters of climate, energy, spatial planning, conservation and traffic. On 7 June 2018, she was appointed alderwoman of The Hague. Her portfolio as alderwoman consists of sustainability and energy transition.

Van Tongeren grew up in Almelo and obtained an LL.B. from VU University Amsterdam and an LL.M. in international law from the University of Amsterdam.

References 
  Parlement.com biography

External links 

 Municipality of The Hague biography

1958 births
Living people
Aldermen of The Hague
Dutch activists
Dutch women activists
Dutch civil servants
Dutch environmentalists
Dutch women environmentalists
Dutch women jurists
GroenLinks politicians
Members of the House of Representatives (Netherlands)
People associated with Greenpeace
People from Almelo
People from Vlaardingen
University of Amsterdam alumni
Vrije Universiteit Amsterdam alumni
21st-century Dutch politicians
21st-century Dutch women politicians